Parker Douglass (born June 25, 1985) is an American football placekicker who is currently a free agent. He was signed by the Sioux Falls Storm as a street free agent in 2009. He played college football at South Dakota State.

Douglass has also been a member of the Cleveland Browns, New York Jets and California Redwoods.

References

External links
South Dakota State Jackrabbits bio

1985 births
Living people
People from Columbus, Nebraska
Players of American football from Nebraska
American football placekickers
South Dakota State Jackrabbits football players
Sioux Falls Storm players
Cleveland Browns players
New York Jets players
Sacramento Mountain Lions players